The 2001 Citrix Tennis Championships was a men's tennis tournament played on outdoor hard courts at the Delray Beach Tennis Center in Delray Beach, Florida in the United States and was part of the International Series of the 2001 ATP Tour. It was the ninth edition of the tournament and ran from March 5 through March 11, 2001. Fourth-seeded Jan-Michael Gambill won the singles title.

Finals

Singles

 Jan-Michael Gambill defeated  Xavier Malisse 7–5, 6–4
 It was Gambill's 1st singles title of the year and the 2nd of his career.

Doubles

 Jan-Michael Gambill /  Andy Roddick defeated  Thomas Shimada /  Myles Wakefield 6–3, 6–4
 It was Gambill's 2nd title of the year and the 4th of his career. It was Roddick's 1st title of the year and the 1st of his career.

References

External links
 Official website
 ATP tournament profile
 ITF tournament edition details

Citrix Tennis Championships
Delray Beach Open
Citrix Tennis Championships
Citrix Tennis Championships
Citrix Tennis Championships